The Sixto-Clementine Vulgate or Clementine Vulgate is the edition promulgated in 1592 by Pope Clement VIII of the Vulgate—a 4th-century Latin translation of the Bible that was written largely by Jerome. It was the second edition of the Vulgate to be authorised by the Catholic Church, the first being the Sixtine Vulgate. The Sixto-Clementine Vulgate was used officially in the Catholic Church until 1979, when the Nova Vulgata was promulgated by Pope John Paul II.

The Sixto-Clementine Vulgate is a revision of the Sixtine Vulgate; the latter had been published two years earlier under Sixtus V. Nine days after the death of Sixtus V, who had issued the Sixtine Vulgate, the College of Cardinals suspended the sale of the Sixtine Vulgate and later ordered the destruction of the copies. Thereafter, two commissions under Gregory XIV were in charge of the revision of the Sixtine Vulgate. In 1592, Clement VIII, arguing printing errors in the Sixtine Vulgate, recalled all copies of the Sixtine Vulgate still in circulation; some suspect his decision was in fact due to the influence of the Jesuits. In the same year, a revised edition of the Sixtine Vulgate was published and promulgated by Clement VIII; this edition is known as the Sixto-Clementine Vulgate, or Clementine Vulgate.

History

Sixtine Vulgate 

The Sixtine Vulgate prepared under Pope Sixtus V was published in 1590; it was "accompanied by a Bull [Aeternus Ille], in which [...] Sixtus V declared it was to be considered the authentic edition recommended by the Council of Trent, that it should be taken as the standard of all future reprints, and that all copies should be corrected by it". The College of Cardinals was dissatisfied with the Sixtine Vulgate; on 5 September 1590, nine days after Pope Sixtus V's death, they ordered the suspension of its sales, withdrew as many copies as possible, and shortly afterwards ordered the destruction of the printed copies.

Gregory XIV's two pontifical commissions 
An official version of the Vulgate was still needed. Therefore, Pope Gregory XIV in 1591 created a fourth commission to revise the Sixtine Vulgate, which was subsequently reorganised as the fifth and final commission later the same year. The fourth commission was created by Gregory XIV on 7 February 1591. It was presided over by M. A. Colonna and comprised six other cardinals working on the revision. Ten other people were part of the commission as advisors, including Robert Bellarmine. These last commissions decided to make only the changes which were really necessary: to do so, the commission would consult ancient manuscripts in Latin, Greek, and Hebrew. It was also decided to restore the passages unduly removed by Sixtus V, remove the additions, examine the other passages and correct them if needed, and revise the punctuation.

The fourth commission worked slightly more than one month; during this time the revision of the Book of Genesis was completed and on 18 March the revision of Exodus began. However, the commission was progressing slowly, and the revision was expected to take a year. Due to this slowness, the size of the commission was reduced, its mode of operation changed, and its workplace moved to the villa of M. A. Colonna in Zagarolo. Two people were members of this commission: M. A. Colonna, its president, and William Allen. This commission also comprised eight other people as advisors: Bartholomew Miranda, Andrea Salvener, Antonius Agellius, Robert Bellarmine, Bartholomew Valverde, Lelio Landi, Petrus Morinus, and Angelo Rocca.

Supposedly, the work of revision was finished in nineteen days thanks to the guidance of the Codex Carafianus—the codex which contained the propositions made to Sixtus V by the commission presided over by Cardinal Carafa, which is a 1583 edition of the Leuven Vulgate that had been emended by the third commission under Carafa—and the experience of four members of the commission who had previously taken part in the work to produce the Sixtine edition (Landi, Valverde, Agellius, and Rocca). The work was completed either after 19 days on 23 June, or on 5 July or before, or in early October, 1591. Brooke Foss Westcott notes that "even if it can be shown that the work extended over six months, it is obvious that there was no time for the examination of new authorities, but only for making a rapid revision with the help of the materials already collected".  The basis of the commission's work was the Codex Carafianus.

Francis J. Thomson considers that the work of revision was rather entrusted to the Congregations for the Index under the leadership of M. A. Colonna. Thomson adds that the Congregation included among others the cardinals , Ascanio Colonna, William Allen, Frederico Borromeo as well as Robert Bellarmine and Francisco de Toledo. Thomson states that the "old idea that a special commission was entrusted with the work of revision [of the Sixtine Vulgate] is incorrect".

Gregory XIV died on 15 October 1591; his direct successor, Innocent IX, died on 30 December the same year, less than two months after his election. In January 1592, Clement VIII became pope. Clement VIII resumed work on the revision to produce a final edition; he appointed Francisco de Toledo, Agostino Valier and Federico Borromeo as editors, with Robert Bellarmine, Antonius Agellius, Petrus Morinus and two others to assist them. "Under Clement VIII's leadership, the commission's work was continued and drastically revised, with the Jesuist scholar Cardinal Robert Bellarmine (1542–1624) bringing to the task his lifelong research on the Vulgate text."

Clement VIII's recall of the Sixtine Vulgate 
In January 1592, Clement VIII became pope and immediately recalled all copies of the Sixtine Vulgate as one of his first acts. The reason stated for the recall was printing errors, although the Sixtine Vulgate was mostly free of those.

According to James Hastings, "[t]he real reasons for the recall of the editions must have been partly personal hostility to Sixtus, and partly a conviction that the book was not quite a worthy representative of the Vulgate text". Eberhard Nestle suggests that the revocation was really due to the influence of the Jesuits, whom Sixtus had offended by putting one of Bellarmine's books on the Index Librorum Prohibitorum (list of banned books). Frederic G. Kenyon writes that the Sixtine Vulgate was "full of errors" but that Clement VIII was also motivated in his decision to recall the edition by the Jesuits, "whom Sixtus had offended". Metzger believes that the inaccuracies may have been a pretext and that the attack against this edition had been instigated by the Jesuits, "whom Sixtus had offended by putting one of Bellarmine's books on the 'Index', and took this method of revenging themselves." Sixtus regarded the Jesuits with disfavour and suspicion. He considered making radical changes to their constitution, but his death prevented this from being carried out. Sixtus V objected to some of the Jesuits' rules and especially to the title "Society of Jesus", and was on the point of changing them when he died. Sixtus V "had some conflict with the Society of Jesus more generally, especially regarding the Society’s concept of blind obedience to the General, which for Sixtus and other important figures of the Roman Curia jeopardized the preeminence of the role of the pope within the Church."

According to Jaroslav Pelikan, the Sixtine Vulgate "proved to be so defective that it was withdrawn".

Publication 

The Clementine Vulgate was printed on 9 November 1592, in folio format, with an anonymous preface written by Cardinal Robert Bellarmine. It was issued containing the Papal bull Cum Sacrorum of 9 November 1592, which asserted that every subsequent edition must be assimilated to this one, that no word of the text may be changed and that variant readings may not be printed in the margin. Most of the misprints of this edition were removed in a second (1593) and a third (1598) edition.

The 1593 and 1598 editions were in quarto.   The 1593 and 1598 editions contained references in the margin, and "various prefaces"; the 1592 edition did not.

This new official version of the Vulgate, known as the Clementine Vulgate, or Sixto-Clementine Vulgate, became the official Bible of the Catholic Church.

Textual characteristics 
The Appendix to the Clementine Vulgate contained additional apocryphal books: Prayer of Manasseh, 3 Esdras, and 4 Esdras. Its version of the Book of Psalms was the Psalterium Gallicanum and not the versio juxta Hebraicum. The 1592 edition did not contain Jerome's prologues, but those prologues were present at the beginning of the volume of the 1593 and 1598 editions. The Clementine Vulgate contains texts of Acts 15:34, the Johannine Comma, and 1 John 5:7. The new system of verse enumeration introduced by the Sixtine Vulgate was replaced by the system of division of verses enumeration of the 1551 edition of the Bible of Robertus Stephanus.

The text of the Clementine Vulgate was close to the Hentenian edition of the Bible, which is the Leuven Vulgate; this is a difference from the Sixtine edition, which had "a text more nearly resembling that of Robertus Stephanus than that of John Hentenius". The Clementine Vulgate used the verse enumeration system of Stephanus and the Leuven Vulgate. The text of the Sixtine Vulgate left an "eternal mark" in the details of the Sixto-Clementine Vulgate: in the latter's "spelling, especially that of the proper nouns, and in its corrections of details, even the less justified ones". The situation concerning the deeper modification Sixtus had made to the Leuven Vulgate text is totally different. The editors tried to make the Clementine Vulgate as similar as possible to the Sixtine Vulgate: titles and frontispieces were similar, and the page numbering of the Sixtine and Clementine editions was identical.

Title 
Scrivener notes that to avoid the appearance of a conflict between the two popes, the Clementine Bible was published under the name of Sixtus, with a preface by Bellarmine. This preface asserted that Sixtus had intended to publish a new edition due to errors that had occurred in the printing of the first, but had been prevented from doing this by his death, and that now, in accordance with his desire, the work was completed by his successor.

The full name of the Clementine Vulgate was Biblia sacra Vulgatae Editionis, Sixti Quinti Pont. Max. iussu recognita atque edita (translation: The Holy Bible of the Common/Vulgate Edition identified and published by the order of Pope Sixtus V). Because the Clementine edition retained the name of Sixtus on its title page, the Clementine Vulgate is sometimes known as the Sixto-Clementine Vulgate.

E. Nestle notes that "the first edition to contain the names of both the Popes [Sixtus V and Clement VIII] upon the title page is that of 1604. The title runs: 'Sixti V. Pont. Max. iussu recognita et Clementis VIII. auctoritate edita. An analysis also shared by Scrivener and Hastings. Hastings adds that "[t]he regular form of title in a modern Vulgate Bible—'Biblia Sacra Vulgatae Editionis Sixti V. Pont. Max. jussu recognita et Clementis VIII. auctoritate edita cannot be traced earlier than 1604. Up until that time Sixtus seems to have been alone on the title-page; after this date, "Clement occasionally figures by himself". This addition of Clement VIII on the title page in 1604 is due to the printing press of Guillaume Rouillé.

Differences from the Sixtine Vulgate 
The Clementine edition of the Vulgate differs from the Sixtine edition in about 3,000 places according to Carlo Vercellone, James Hastings, Eberhard Nestle, F. G. Kenyon, the Oxford Dictionary of the Christian Church, and Bruce M. Metzger; 4,900 according to Michael Hetzenauer, and Bruce M. Metzger & Bart D. Ehrman in their co-written book; and "roughly five thousand" according to Kurt and Barbara Aland.

Some examples of text changes include, for example in Exodus 2, where the text of the Sixtine Vulgate "constituit te" (2:14), "venerant" (2:16), "et eripuit" (2:22), and "liberavit" (2:25) is replaced in the Clementine Vulgate respectively by "te constituit", "venerunt", "eripuit", and "cognovit".

Criticism 
Research later made after the printing of the Clementine Vulgate "has shown that the Clementine edition departs at many points from Jerome's text [the Vulgate]".

Contemporary critiques 
The differences between the Sixtine and Clementine editions of the Vulgate have been criticised by Protestants; Thomas James in his Bellum Papale sive Concordia discors (London, 1600) "upbraids the two Popes on their high pretensions and the palpable failure of at least one, possibly both of them". He gave a long list of about 2,000 differences between these two editions. In the preface to the first edition of the King James Version (1611), translators accused the pope of perversion of the Holy Scripture.

Modern critiques 
James Hastings said he "willingly admit[s]" that "on the whole [...] the Clementine text is critically an improvement upon the Sixtine". According to Frederic G. Kenyon, "[i]t cannot be pretended that the Clementine text is satisfactory from the point of view of history or scholarship"; he also said the changes that differentiate the Clementine edition from the Sixtine edition "except where they simply remove an obvious blunder, are, for the most part, no improvement". Henri Quentin wrote: "Overall, the Clementine edition is a little better than the Sixtine, but it does not mark considerable progress".

Kurt and Barbara Aland wrote that "neither the edition of 1590 nor that of 1592 [...] succeeded in representing either Jerome's original text [...] or its Greek base with any accuracy." Monsignor Roger Gryson, a patristics scholar at the Catholic University of Louvain, asserts in the preface to the 4th edition of the Stuttgart Vulgate (1994) that the Clementine edition "frequently deviates from the manuscript tradition for literary or doctrinal reasons, and offers only a faint reflection of the original Vulgate, as read in the pandecta of the first millennium." By the same token however, the great extent to which the Clementine edition preserves contaminated readings from the medieval period can itself be considered to have critical value; Frans Van Liere states: "for the medieval student interested in the text as it was read, for instance, in thirteenth century Paris, the Sixto-Clementine Vulgate might actually be a better representative of the scholastic biblical text than the modern critical editions of the text in its pre-Carolingian form." Houghton states that "[t]he Clementine Vulgate is often a better guide to the text of the mediaeval Vulgate than critical editions of the earliest attainable text."

Later printings 
In the early 20th century, more people became aware of the inadequacies of the Clementine Vulgate, and in 1906 a new edition of the Clementine Vulgate edited by Michael Hetzenauer was published (Biblia sacra vulgatae editionis: ex ipsis exemplaribus vaticanis inter se atque cum indice errorum corrigendorum collatis critice); his edition was based on the 1592, 1593, and 1598 printings of the Clementine Vulgate, and includes authorised corrections.

In critical editions of the Bible text 
The 1592 edition of the Clementine Vulgate is cited in the Nestle-Aland, where it is designated by the siglum vgcl, and in the Oxford Vulgate New Testament (also known as the Oxford Vulgate), where it is designated by the siglum . The 1592, 1593 and 1598 editions are cited in the Stuttgart Vulgate, where they are collectively designated by the siglum .

Nova Vulgata 

The Clementine Vulgate remained the standard Bible of the Roman Catholic Church until 1979, when the Nova Vulgata was promulgated by Pope John Paul II.

See also 
 Bible translations into Latin
 Douay–Rheims Bible
 Latin Psalters
 Vulgate
 Sixtine Vulgate
Nova Vulgata

Notes

References

Works cited

Further reading

External links 

Original editions
Scan of the 1592 edition and text of the 1592 edition by the Instituto Nazionale di Studi sul Rinascimento (Click on "metadati" if the image does not load)
1592 edition on Google books
Scan of the 1598 edition

Editions

 (edition of the 1592 version of the Vulgate with variations from the two other subsequent editions (1593 and 1598) as well as of the 1590 Sixtine Vulgate)

Vulgata Clementina – VulSearch & the Clementine Vulgate project
The Clementine Vulgate, fully searchable, with the ability to compare with both the Douay Rheims and Knox Bibles side by side.

Translations

Catholic Public Domain Version, 2009 (open source translation of the Clementine Vulgate into English)

Miscellaneous

 Notice of the 1593 edition on the website of the Morgan Library and Museum: here

16th-century Latin books
16th-century Catholicism
16th-century Christian texts
Documents of Pope Clement VIII
Early printed Bibles
Editions of the Vulgate
Catholic bibles